The BBC Recordings was the last live compilation album by Welsh rock band Budgie. The tracks on this album were taken from five shows.

Track listing

Disc one, tracks 1-4 recorded at Paris Theatre in London, October 19, 1972.
Disc one, tracks 5-11 recorded at the Reading Festival, 1980.
Disc two, tracks 1-2 recorded on the John Peel Show, July 1, 1976.
Disc two, tracks 3-5 recorded on the Friday Rock Show, December 18, 1981.
Disc two, tracks 6-12 recorded at the Reading Festival, 1982.

Personnel
Budgie
Burke Shelley - bass, vocals
Tony Bourge - guitar
John Thomas - guitar
Steve Williams - drums
Ray Phillips - drums

References

Budgie (band) live albums
2006 live albums
BBC Radio recordings
Budgie